Magdalo may refer to:

Philippines
Magdalo (faction), a faction of the Katipunan, a 19th century Philippine revolutionary group
Magdalo Group, a group of dissident soldiers in the Philippines during the 21st century
Magdalo Party-List, a political party-list that represents retired Filipino soldiers
Partido Magdalo, a local political party in Cavite, Philippines
Samahang Magdalo, a nationalist organization based in the Philippines

Other
Magdalo Mussio, Italian author, artist, animator, and inventor